Mary Hartley (born August 16, 1954) is an American politician who served in the Arizona Senate from the 20th district from 1995 to 2003.

References

1954 births
Living people
Democratic Party Arizona state senators